Steve Berthiaume is an American television sportscaster who serves as the play-by-play broadcast announcer for the Arizona Diamondbacks and is a former anchor on ESPN and a former sportscaster for SportsNet New York (SNY). He is married to former SportsCenter anchor Cindy Brunson. He grew up in Medfield, Massachusetts where he ran cross country track and was the announcer for the basketball team.

Broadcasting career

Early career
A graduate of Emerson College, Berthiaume's broadcasting career began at WTIC-TV in Hartford, Connecticut, where he covered University of Connecticut men's and women's basketball and their involvement in the NCAA tournament. He then went on to the now-defunct CNNSI network and eventually to ESPN in February 2000, starting at ESPNEWS and later, anchoring for SportsCenter.
In October 2012, Steve Berthiaume was selected as the Arizona Diamondbacks' broadcaster replacing Daron Sutton. Berthiaume also spent time as an anchor at the ABC affiliate in Pensacola, Florida (WEAR), as well as the NBC affiliates in Providence, Rhode Island; Columbia, South Carolina; and Charlottesville, Virginia (WJAR-TV, WIS-TV, and WVIR-TV, respectively). In 2008 the Bleacher Report released the rankings of the current top 50 worst announcers. Berthiaume would rank number 33 on that report.

SNY and back to ESPN
In 2006, Berthiaume left ESPN to become chief sportscaster for the new SNY network started by the New York Mets; however, in late January 2007, SNY let Berthiaume out of his contract to rejoin ESPN's SportsCenter on March 28, 2007, in order to work closer to his wife. He also anchored many (usually weekend) editions of Baseball Tonight.

Arizona Diamondbacks
In 2012, Berthiaume was hired by MLB's Arizona Diamondbacks to serve as a play-by-play broadcaster for FOX Sports Arizona, replacing Daron Sutton, and was quoted as saying, "The opportunity to be at the ballpark every day is a dream come true. I'm thrilled." Berthiaume's previous play-by-play experience comes from ESPN, where he called several professional games as well as the College World Series.

Personal life

Berthiaume is married to sports anchor and reporter of ESPN's SportsCenter, Cindy Brunson.

External links
Steve Berthiaume ESPN Bio

References

Living people
American television sports anchors
American television sports announcers
Arizona Diamondbacks announcers
Emerson College alumni
Major League Baseball broadcasters
New York Mets announcers
People from Medfield, Massachusetts
Year of birth missing (living people)